Elections to Salford Council were held on 1 May 2003. One third of the council was up for election. The Labour Party kept overall control of the council. Overall turnout was 40.7%.

After the election, the composition of the council was:
Labour 51
Liberal Democrat 5
Conservative 3
Independent 1

Election result

|}

Ward results

References

2003
2003 English local elections
2000s in Greater Manchester